Ilya Vladimirovich Kukharchuk (born 2 August 1990) is a Russian football player. He plays for Torpedo Moscow. He plays as a winger (on either side of the field) or a centre forward.

Club career
Kukharchuk made his professional debut for FC Rubin Kazan on 15 July 2009 in the Russian Cup game against FC Volga Tver.

He made his Russian Premier League debut for FC Anzhi Makhachkala on 7 August 2010 in a game against FC Amkar Perm.

On 24 January 2019, he signed with FC Khimki.

On 12 January 2023, Kukharchuk signed a long-term contract with Torpedo Moscow.

Personal life
He is the older brother of Dmitri Kukharchuk.

Career statistics

References

External links
 
 

1990 births
People from Kostroma
Sportspeople from Kostroma Oblast
Living people
Russian footballers
Russia youth international footballers
Association football forwards
FC Rubin Kazan players
FC Anzhi Makhachkala players
FC Ural Yekaterinburg players
PFC Spartak Nalchik players
FC Shinnik Yaroslavl players
FC Volga Nizhny Novgorod players
FC Yenisey Krasnoyarsk players
FC Baltika Kaliningrad players
FC Tambov players
FC Tom Tomsk players
FC Khimki players
FC Torpedo Moscow players
Russian Premier League players
Russian First League players